Taiwanese Hangul is an orthography system for Taiwanese Hokkien (Taiwanese). Developed and promoted by Taiwanese linguist  in 1987, it uses a modified Hangul alphabets to represent spoken Taiwanese, and was later supported by Ang Ui-jin. Because both Chinese characters and Hangul are both written in the space of square boxes, unlike letters of the Latin alphabet, the use of Chinese-Hangul mixed writing is able to keep the spacing between the two scripts more consistent compared to Chinese-Latin mixed writing.

Letters

Initials

Vowels

Coda endings 
{|
|valign=top|

Tone markings

Different use of Hangul between Taiwanese and Korean

Examples

Matthew 6:1

References

External links 
Taiwanese Hangul

Hangul
Hokkien writing system
Writing systems introduced in 1987